Luigino Celestino di Agostino (born 17 December 1967), known professionally as Gigi D'Agostino, is an Italian DJ, remixer, singer and record producer. In 1986, he started his career as a DJ spinning Italo disco. His biggest chart successes include "Bla Bla Bla", "Another Way", a cover of Nik Kershaw's "The Riddle", "La Passion", "Super" and "L'Amour Toujours", all in the years 1999 and 2000. The hookline of "L'Amour Toujours" was also used for the 2018 hit remix/mashup "In My Mind".

Early life and education
Born in Turin, Italy on 17 December 1967, to parents from Salerno, Campania, D'Agostino spent his childhood between Turin and Brescia, where the Media Records studios are located. As a child, D'Agostino wanted to be someone in the world of disco music. Starting out working as a stonemason and a fitter, he began his musical career as a DJ by organizing parties in clubs. His debut was in a club near Turin called "Woodstock". He worked also in a small club called Palladio in Cascinette d'Ivrea (30 km north from Turin) from 1987 until around 1992 and in a club called Le Palace in the Valentino Castle Garden in Turin. He was resident DJ of an Italian disco named Ultimo Impero from 1993 to 1998.

Career

1990s
D'Agostino's first release was Noise Makers Theme, a double-A-sided record with a track by Daniele Gas on the other side, which launched the Noise Maker label, under the direction of Italo house producer Gianfranco Bortolotti. D'Agostino would continue working with Gas, as well as Mauro Picotto's production team in the following years. As a DJ, D'Agostino is known as one of the "pioneers of Mediterranean Progressive Dance", consisting of minimalistic sounds and Latin and Mediterranean melodies. As a record producer, D'Agostino's uses the pseudonym "Gigi Dag"; he transforms a piece, originally destined for the discos, into a success for the mainstream public.

After successes like the track "Sweetly", he joined the team of Bortolotti, the general manager of Media Records and suddenly reached the top of the hit parades. His single "FLY", published in 1996 with BXR Noise Maker, the label created by Media Records for Mediterranea progressive house, reached the top of the sales in Italy. This was followed by his single "Gigi's Violin".

Subsequently, D'Agostino released the song "Angel's Symphony" with R.A.F. by Mauro Picotto, a friend from Media Records. His biggest project was the self-titled album Gigi D'Agostino, consisting of 19 tracks, which sold over 60,000 copies.

After his rise to success, D'Agostino's musical style changed, with his sound becoming more melodic, at midway between house and progressive, with more energetic and melodious sonorities and less obsessive rhythms, also known as Italo dance.

In 1997, he released the single "Gin Lemon", followed by "Your Love (Elisir)" (1998), "Cuba Libre" (1999), and "Bla Bla Bla" (1999). He later released the album Eurodance Compilation, which contained five unpublished tracks. With this compilation, he earned a platinum disc and was awarded "Best Producer in 1999" at the Italian Dance Awards. In October, D'Agostino released another hit single, entitled "Another Way".

In 1999, his album L'Amour Toujours (released in 2001 in the United States) included 23 tracks on two CDs, with the hit song "L'Amour Toujours" bringing him to the 10th position in the sales parade in Italy; as a result, he earned another Platinum Disc. His 1999 single "Bla Bla Bla" became a major hit in Europe. He described the single as "a piece I wrote thinking of all the people who talk and talk without saying anything!"

2000s

In 2000, his remake of the Nik Kershaw song "The Riddle" sold 1,000,000 copies in Germany and 200,000 copies in France. He also released the albums Tecno Fes (August 2000) and Tecno Fes - EP, Vol. 2 (December 2000).

In 2001, he released L'Amour Toujours EP, consisting of three songs: two new versions of "L'amour Toujours" and "Un Giorno Credi", a single made in collaboration with Edoardo Bennato. "Un Giorno Credi" reached the top of the parades in Italy and became one of the most played songs in the national and international music networks. He was also awarded with "Best DJ-Producer of the Year" at the "Red Bull Awards" in Italy.

In 2001, he also released the hit "Super", as a result of a collaboration with Albertino (an Italian music artist), which won him the awards "Best Dance Producer" at the PIM (Italian Music Award) and "Public Award" at the Danish DJs Award in Copenhagen, Denmark. In December of that year, he released Il Grande Viaggio, a compilation of his favourite songs, including old electronic pieces and new rhythms and melodies. As a result, he was awarded with "Best Dance Producer" at the Italian Dance Awards.

In 2003, he released the song "Ripassa" in the EP Underconstruction 1: Silence, a hit which is very important for his next productions. This song helped influence Lento Violento, a subgenre that had yet to be distinguished.

On 15 July 2004, his compilation "Euro Dance" won Platinum certification with 120,000 copies sold in just a few weeks.

In December 2004, D'Agostino released his fourth studio album, L'Amour Toujours II.D'Agostino has played in some well-known clubs throughout Europe, including in Italy, Spain, France, the Netherlands, the Czech Republic, Germany, Switzerland, and England (in 1996, he played at the Ministry of Sound in London with Mauro Picotto).

In 2006, he created his own new record label called "Noisemaker Hard" to differentiate the style of music released under his older record label, "Noisemaker".

In 2007, D'Agostino released Lento Violento ...e altre storie, a compilation which contains two CDs and his new 35 Lento Violento songs. Most important "hits" of the album are "Cammino" (a collaboration with Dimitri Mazza) and "Vorrei Fare una Canzone" (a collaboration with Gerolamo Sacco) according to YouTube views.

After some months, he released the compilation La musica che pesta under the name "Lento Violento Man", which contains two CDs for a total of 38 unmixed tracks.

From 2005 until January 2010, he had radio programs, on the Italian Radio m2o Musica allo Stato Puro (in English: "Music at the Pure State"), called "Il Cammino di Gigi D'Agostino" and "Quello che mi piace
". They consist of DJ sets played by Gigi, and featured new remixes of his songs and songs by Italian and international artists.

2010s
In August 2011, he released a digital single Stay With Me. This was released a few months after he postponed the release of his upcoming album Mondo Reale.

In May 2017, CBC News reported that his music is popular in the remote Canadian Inuit community of Arviat, where D'Agostino's "slicing, bass-heavy beats have a lot in common with the music of traditional Inuit drum-dancing."

In 2018, along with Dynoro, Gigi released "In My Mind" which became an international hit.

Logo 

Since the release of his album Bla Bla Bla in 1999, many of his future covers will feature the following logo.

The author of the emblem is unknown.

The mark represents the character 舞 wǔ, and is taken from the Chinese language and translated to English means to dance.

Discography

Studio albums

Extended plays

Compilations
 A Journey into Space (1996)
Le Voyage Estate (1996)
 The Greatest Hits (1996) (best-of album)
Progressiva (1996)
Progressiva Hyperspace (1997)
 Il Grande Viaggio Di Gigi D'Agostino Vol. 1 (2001)
 Il programmino di Gigi D'agostino (2003)
Live at Altromondo (2003)
 Benessere 1 (2004)
Live at Altromondo 2 (2004)
 Laboratorio 1 (2004)
 Laboratorio 2 (2005)
 Laboratorio 3 (2005)
 Disco Tanz (2005)
 Some Experiments (2006)
 Lento Violento ...e altre storie (2007)
 La Musica Che Pesta (as Lento Violento Man) (2007)
 Suono Libero (2008)
Movimenti Incoerenti Vol. 1 (2009)
Movimenti Incoerenti Vol. 2 (2009)
Movimenti Incoerenti Vol. 3 (2009)
 The Essential Gigi D'Agostino (2009) (Austria and Germany only) (best-of album)
 Ieri & Oggi Mix Vol. 1 (2010)
 Ieri & Oggi Mix Vol. 2 (2010)
 Gigi D'Agostino Collection Vol. 1 (2019)
Gigi D'Agostino Collection Vol. 2 (2019)

Singles

DJ Magazine Top 100 DJs

References

External links
 

1967 births
Living people
Arista Records artists
Eurodance musicians
Italian dance musicians
Italian DJs
Italian electronic musicians
Musicians from Turin
Electronic dance music DJs
People of Campanian descent